Yedian is a town in Mengyin County, Shandong province, China. , it has 25 villages under its administration:
Yedian Village
Jiaopo Village
Yanzhuang Village
Maoping Village
Shiquan Village
Nanyu Village
Nanyanzi Village
Beiping Village
Qipanshi Village
Shangdongmen Village
Banguya Village
Sangziyu Village
Dashan Village
Dashitou Village
Huangtuliang Village
Yanmazhuang Village
Beiyanzi Village
Yingtaoyu Village
Sanhe Village
Yushi Village
Zhujiapo Village
Xinsheng Village
Ping'an Village
Suozhuang Village
Jinquanyu Village

See also 
 List of township-level divisions of Shandong

References 

Township-level divisions of Shandong
Mengyin County